Årdal is a former municipality in Rogaland county, Norway.  The  municipality existed from 1859 until 1965. It stretched from the head of the Årdalsfjorden in the west to the county border in the east.  It encompassed the southern half of the present-day Hjelmeland Municipality. The administrative centre of the municipality was the village of Årdal where the Old Årdal Church is located.

History
The municipality of Aardal was established in 1859 when the large municipality of Hjelmeland was divided into two: Årdal in the south (population: 1,315) and Hjelmeland og Fister in the north (population: 3,084). On 6 March 1869, a small area of Aardal (population: 40) was transferred to the neighboring municipality of Hjelmeland og Fister.  The spelling of the name was changed to Årdal in the early 20th century.  On 1 January 1965 the municipality of Årdal was dissolved due to the recommendations of the Schei Committee.  The majority of Årdal, with 743 inhabitants, was merged into Hjelmeland municipality once again. At the same time, the Sunngardene district (population: 121) was transferred to the neighboring Strand municipality.

Old Årdal Church
Årdal is well known for the Old Årdal Church which received its final shape after expansion shortly after it was built in the early 17th century. The church was marked by the work of two local artists, the German-born painter Gottfried Hendtzschel (d. 1657 in Stavanger) and the craftsman Lauritz Snekker who was his student. The altarpiece and the pulpit was painted by Hendtzschel. They were both carved by Snekker who was also responsible for most of the carpentry work. The artistic efforts of Hendtzschel and Snekker within various churches in the vicinity formed a part of the Stranganger Renaissance (Stavangerrenaissance), the cultural period which peaked in the middle of the 17th century in the area around Stavanger.

Government
All municipalities in Norway, including Årdal, are responsible for primary education (through 10th grade), outpatient health services, senior citizen services, unemployment and other social services, zoning, economic development, and municipal roads.  The municipality is governed by a municipal council of elected representatives, which in turn elects a mayor.

Municipal council
The municipal council  of Årdal was made up of representatives that were elected to four year terms.  The party breakdown of the final municipal council was as follows:

See also
List of former municipalities of Norway

References

Hjelmeland
Former municipalities of Norway
1859 establishments in Norway
1965 disestablishments in Norway